The Battle of Kodunga was a military engagement between the Nigerian Armed Forces and Boko Haram insurgents in Konduga, Borno State, northeastern Nigeria, in September 2014.

Background
Boko Haram is an Islamic militant group, who pledge allegiance to the Islamic State of Iraq and the Levant. Boko Haram has been carrying out attacks in Nigeria since 2009, and more recently in Cameroon, Chad and Niger as well. Past estimates have stated that Nigeria held the highest number of terrorist attacks in 2013. 

Boko Haram carried out previous attacks in Konduga, including a mass shooting in 2013 and massacres in January and February 2014.

Battle
In September 2014, military reports said that Boko Haram fighters attempted to capture the town of Konduga. Nigerian infantry successfully repelled the attack through a combined assault of ground soldiers and aerial attacks. 100 Boko Haram fighters were confirmed killed, while only a "handful" fled the battle, with most of the dead being beyond recognition. The armed forces proceeded to seize anti-aircraft guns, rocket-propelled grenades, several Hilux vehicles and motorcycles, and an armored personal carrier (APC).

Aftermath
After the battle, Nigerian Defense Headquarters made a public statement, reassuring residents of Maiduguri and its surrounding areas of safety from Boko Haram.

There was another battle in Konduga between Boko Haram and the armed forces on 2 March 2015, which Nigeria also won. BH carried out suicide bombings in Konduga in 2018 and 2019.

References

2010s in Borno State
Konduga
Boko Haram insurgency
Islamic terrorist incidents in 2014
Battle, 2014
Nigerian Army
September 2014 events in Nigeria
Terrorist incidents in Borno State 
Terrorist incidents in Nigeria in 2014